Henry "Orator" Hunt (6 November 1773 – 15 February 1835) was a British radical speaker and agitator remembered as a pioneer of working-class radicalism and an important influence on the later Chartist movement. He advocated parliamentary reform and the repeal of the Corn Laws. He was the first member of parliament to advocate for women's suffrage; in 1832 he presented a petition to parliament from a woman asking for the right to vote.

Background
Hunt was born on 6 November 1773 in Upavon, Wiltshire.

Career

Hunt became a prosperous farmer. He was first drawn into radical politics during the Napoleonic Wars, becoming a supporter of Francis Burdett.  His talent for public speaking became noted in the electoral politics of Bristol, where he denounced the complacency of both the Whigs and the Tories, and proclaimed himself a supporter of democratic radicalism.  It was thanks to his particular talents that a new programme beyond the narrow politics of the day made steady progress in the difficult years that followed the conclusion of the war with France.

Orator

After his rousing speeches at mass meetings held in Spa Fields in London in 1816, Hunt became known as the "Orator", a nickname attributed to Robert Southey.  He embraced a programme that included annual parliaments and universal suffrage, promoted openly and with none of the conspiratorial element of the old Jacobin clubs.  The tactic he most favoured was that of 'mass pressure', which he felt, if given enough weight, could achieve reform without insurrection.

His efforts at mass politics had the effect of radicalising large sections of the community unrepresented in Parliament, although the direct success of these efforts was limited.

Peterloo

Hunt was invited by the Patriotic Union Society, formed by the Manchester Observer, to be one of the scheduled speakers at a rally in Manchester on 16 August 1819, which turned into the Peterloo massacre. Arrested for high treason and convicted of the lesser charge of seditious conspiracy, he was sentenced to a term of 30 months at Ilchester Gaol. For the establishment, Hunt believed in some concepts that could threaten the profits of the business establishment: equal rights, universal suffrage, parliamentary reform, and an end to child labour.

The debacle at Peterloo, caused by an over-reaction of the local Manchester authorities, added greatly to his prestige. Moral force was not sufficient in itself, and physical force entailed too great a risk. Although urged to do so after Peterloo, Hunt refused to give his approval to schemes for a full-scale insurrection. Thereby momentum was lost, as more desperate souls turned to worn out cloak-and-dagger schemes, which surfaced in the Cato Street conspiracy.

While in prison for his role at Peterloo, Hunt turned to writing to disseminate his message, through a variety of forms including an autobiography. After his release he attempted to recover some of his lost fortune through new business ventures in London, which included the production and marketing of a roasted corn Breakfast Powder, the "most salubrious and nourishing Beverage that can be substituted for the use of Tea and Coffee, which are always exciting, and frequently the most irritating to the Stomach and Bowels."  He also made shoe-blacking bottles, which carried the slogan "Equal Laws, Equal Rights, Annual Parliaments, Universal Suffrage, and the Ballot."  Synthetic coal, intended specifically for the French market, was another of his schemes.  After the July Revolution in 1830 he sent samples to Gilbert du Motier, marquis de La Fayette and other political heroes, along with fraternal greetings.

Parliament

Business interests notwithstanding, he still found time for practical politics, fighting battles over a whole range of issues, and always pushing for reform and accountability. In 1830 he became a member of Parliament for Preston defeating the future British Prime Minister Edward Stanley, but was defeated when standing for re-election in 1833.  As a consistent champion of the working classes, a term he used with increasing frequency, he opposed the Whigs, both old and new, and the Reform Act 1832, which he believed did not go far enough in the extension of the franchise.  He gave speeches addressed to the "Working Classes and no other", urging them to press for full equal rights.  In 1832 he presented the first petition in support of women's suffrage to Parliament. It was received however with much ribald laughter and antagonism. Also in that year, he petitioned parliament on behalf of the radical preacher John Ward, who had been imprisoned for blasphemy.

In his opposition to the Reform Bill, Orator Hunt revived the Great Northern Union, a pressure group he set up some years before, intended to unite the northern industrial workers behind a platform of full democratic reform; and it is in this specifically that his influence on Chartism can be detected.

Death

Hunt's health declined during 1834, and in early 1835 he suffered a severe stroke at Alresford, Hampshire, where he died on 15 February 1835. He was buried at Parham Park, Sussex.

Legacy

A monument to Hunt was erected in 1842 by "the working people", in Every Street, Manchester, in Scholefield's Chapel Yard. A "spiral"  march was held on the anniversary of Peterloo, from Piccadilly around the town past the Peterloo site, down to Deansgate and through Ancoats to the monument. The monument's stonework deteriorated, and it was demolished in 1888.

In popular culture

In Mike Leigh's 2018 film Peterloo, Hunt is portrayed by Rory Kinnear.

See also

 Peterloo Massacre

References 

Belchem, John. "Orator" Hunt: Henry Hunt and English Working-Class Radicalism. Clarendon, 1985. . Republished by Breviary Stuff Publications, 2012. .

 Memoirs of Henry Hunt, Esq. Written by himself in his Majesty's Jail at Ilchester, three volumes, 1820–1822
 Addresses to the Radical Reformers of England, Ireland and Scotland 1820–1822, Henry Hunt
 Addresses from Henry Hunt, Esq. M.P. to the Radical Reformers of England, Ireland and Scotland, on the measures of the Whig Ministers since they have been in place and power, 1–13, 1831–1832
 The Preston Cock's Reply to the Kensington Dunghill, 1831
 The Casualties of Peterloo, Bush, Michael, 2006

External links 
 
 
 
 Guide to the Henry Hunt Papers MS 563 1760-1838 at the University of Chicago Special Collections Research Center 

1773 births
1835 deaths
Members of the Parliament of the United Kingdom for English constituencies
UK MPs 1830–1831
UK MPs 1831–1832
People from Wiltshire
British radicals